The Delegation for Relations with South Africa (D-ZA) is a delegation of the European Parliament. Its current chair is the Dutch politician Hans van Baalen (VVD).

It was created by the European Parliament in 1994 after inter-parliamentary relations with South Africa were frozen during the apartheid years. The EP Delegation is responsible for the Parliament's EU-South Africa relations, and it provides political dialogue with a parliamentary dimension.

Chairs
 2014–present: Johannes Cornelis van Baalen

References

External links
 D-ZA official website

Committees of the European Parliament